Republic Theater, also known as the Falls Theater, is a historic movie theater located at Great Falls, Chester County, South Carolina. It was built by Republic Cotton Mills in 1921–1922, and is a rectangular, light-colored brick structure on a limestone-colored stucco foundation. The façade has a large segmental arch entrance framed by terra cotta decoration and a molded terra cotta cornice. The theater closed in 1974.

It was listed on the National Register of Historic Places in 1980.

References

Theatres on the National Register of Historic Places in South Carolina
Buildings and structures completed in 1922
Buildings and structures in Chester County, South Carolina
National Register of Historic Places in Chester County, South Carolina